Smith's Wood Academy (formerly Smith's Wood School and then Smith's Wood Sports College) is a co-educational secondary school located in Smith's Wood in the West Midlands of England.

Smith's Wood School was awarded specialist Sports College status in September 2006 and was renamed Smith's Wood Sports College. Formerly a community school administered by Solihull Metropolitan Borough Council, in September 2017 Smith's Wood Sports College converted to academy status and was renamed Smith's Wood Academy. The school is now sponsored by the Fairfax Multi-Academy Trust.

Teaching 
Smith's Wood Academy offers GCSEs and BTECs as programmes of study for pupils.

History

Fire in 1977
A fire on Saturday 1 October 1977 destroyed changing rooms.

References

External links
Smith's Wood Academy official website

Academies in Solihull
Arson in the 1970s
School buildings in the United Kingdom destroyed by arson
Secondary schools in Solihull